Urban rail transit in Canada encompasses a broad range of rail mass transit systems, including commuter rail, rapid transit, light rail, and streetcar systems.

Terminology 

 "Commuter rail" refers to urban passenger train service between a central city and its suburbs. Three such systems exist in Canada.
 "Airport rail link" refers to rail transport between a central city and a nearby international airport. The Union Pearson Express is the only dedicated airport rail link in Canada. The SkyTrain's Canada Line also serves as an airport rail link.
 "Subway" refers to a rapid transit system using heavy rail with steel wheels. The Toronto subway is the only such system in Canada.
 "Rubber-tired metro" refers to a rapid transit system using heavy rail with rubber tires. The Montreal Metro is the only such system in Canada.
 "Light metro" refers to a rapid transit system using intermediate or medium-capacity rail. The SkyTrain is the only full light metro system in Canada. The Toronto subway system includes one light metro line.
 "Light rail" refers to a rail transit system using light rail vehicles in a dedicated right-of-way. Four such systems exist in Canada.
 "Streetcar" refers to a rail transit system using light rail vehicles entirely or mostly on streets providing local service in mixed traffic. The Toronto streetcar is the only such system in Canada.
 "People mover" refers to a small-scale automated guideway transit system. The Terminal Link is the only such system in Canada.

Existing systems 

Italics indicate a line under construction.

Calgary 

Calgary Transit's CTrain network, which started operation in 1981, now has the second-highest weekday ridership of any light rail transit system in North America, surpassed only by Guadalajara light rail system in Mexico. The CTrain carried over 312,000 passengers per weekday in the fourth quarter of 2018. There are 45 stations in operation in the  CTrain light rail system. After starting by running on one leg in 1981, the system has expanded and now has four legs radiating out into Calgary's suburbs in different directions. The legs have been organized into two routes (identified as the Red Line and the Blue Line) that connect the four legs via shared tracks in a downtown transit mall. The existing four legs of the system, as built in chronological order, are the south leg (1981), the northeast leg (1985), the northwest leg (1987), and the west leg (2012).

 The Downtown Transit Mall along 7th Avenue South is shared by the Red and Blue lines.
 The Red Line is a  line that connects the south and northwest legs via the downtown transit mall.
 The Blue Line is a  line that connects the northeast and west legs via the downtown transit mall.

The Green Line is a planned line that would connect new southeast and north legs via a downtown tunnel.

Edmonton 

The Edmonton Transit System's LRT system consisted of only one line from its opening in 1978 to 2015. The current  system includes the original Capital Line and the new Metro Line, sharing part of their route. The first phase of the Valley Line is under construction.

 The Capital Line runs roughly north–south, between northeast Edmonton and the Century Park community, with a mix of tunnels and at-grade track. Six stations are underground, while the remaining nine are at-grade.
 The Metro Line is interlined with the Capital Line from Health Sciences/Jubilee and through the underground portions before branching northwest towards NAIT.
 The Valley Line is currently under construction. The low-floor line will travel southeast from downtown towards Mill Woods.

Extensions to the Capital, Metro, and Valley lines have been approved. The construction of two new lines, the Energy and Festival lines, has been proposed.

Montreal 

Exo operates five commuter rail lines in Greater Montreal, including the Island of Montreal, Montreal, and South Shore. Each line terminates at Montreal Central Station or Lucien-L'Allier, both in downtown Montreal, with connections to the metro system. Most of the system is run on Canadian National or Canadian Pacific trackage. Exo formerly owned and operated the Mount Royal Tunnel and the Deux-Montagnes line until service was ended in 2020. The Réseau express métropolitain light metro system is set to take over the Mount Royal Tunnel and the Deux-Montagnes line.

The Montreal Metro is Canada's second-busiest rail transit system. Drawing inspiration from the Paris Métro, it uses rubber-tired metro technology, the only such system in Canada. The  system has 68 stations on four lines, which serve the north, east, and central portions of the Island of Montreal, as well as the suburbs of Laval and Longueuil. The metro began in 1966 with the east–west Green Line and the north–south Orange Line. A series of expansions since 1966 have expanded the original lines and added the Yellow and Blue lines.

 The Green Line is a  line that runs northeast to southwest between Angrignon and Honoré-Beaugrand. The two ends are connected through a central section that runs under De Maisonneuve Boulevard in downtown Montreal.
 The Orange Line is a  U-shaped line. The central section runs through downtown Montreal, south of the Green Line's alignment. The two legs connect to Côte-Vertu in the northwest and Montmorency in Laval, northeast of Montreal.
 The Yellow Line is a  line with three stations. It connects to the Green and Orange lines at Berri–UQAM station, the system's busiest station, and crosses under the Saint Lawrence River to connect Saint Helen's Island and Longueuil.
 The Blue Line is a  line. It runs in a northeast to southwest alignment north of the Green Line, connecting the east island with both legs of the Orange Line.

An eastward extension of the Blue Line is planned to begin construction in 2021.

Ottawa 

The O-Train began in 2001 as a light rail pilot project to supplement Ottawa's Transitway bus rapid transit system. This original line, now known as the Trillium Line, was relatively inexpensive to construct ($21 million) due to its single-track route along a little used freight-rail right-of-way and used diesel multiple units (DMUs) to avoid the cost of building overhead lines along the tracks. The Confederation Line opened in September 2019, replacing portions of the Transitway with an underground tunnel through downtown.

 The Confederation Line (Line 1) is a light rail line which runs east–west from Blair to Tunney's Pasture connecting to the Transitway at each terminus and with the Trillium Line at Bayview. The line runs both underground and on the surface and is completely grade-separated. There is a tunnel downtown with three underground stations.
 The Trillium Line (Line 2) is an  diesel light rail line running north to south from Bayview station to Greenboro station, connecting with the Confederation Line at its northern terminus and the Transitway at its southern terminus. There are three passing sidings along the single-track line.

Stage 2 of Ottawa's O-Train expansion is currently under construction, which will expand the Confederation Line east and west and the Trillium Line south.

Toronto 

GO Transit operates commuter rail services in the Greater Golden Horseshoe, including the metropolitan areas of Toronto, Hamilton, Kitchener, Niagara, Oshawa, Barrie, and Guelph. Each of its seven lines terminate at Union Station in downtown Toronto. With 217,500 average weekday riders, it is Canada's busiest commuter rail service, and the fifth-busiest in North America. The GO Expansion project currently underway will bring electrification, new trackage, bridges, and tunnels to the system, allowing for two-way all-day service with 15-minute frequencies to sections of five of its lines.

GO Transit's parent agency, Metrolinx, also operates the Union Pearson Express, an airport rail link between Union Station and Toronto Pearson International Airport. It opened in advance of the 2015 Pan American Games, sharing most of its routing with GO's Kitchener line before travelling along a  rail spur to the airport. At the airport, the line connects with the Terminal Link, a free people mover transporting passenger between the airport's terminals and parking garage.

The Toronto Transit Commission's  subway is Canada's oldest rapid transit system, having opened as the "Yonge subway" in 1954. It is also Canada's busiest system, with 1,603,300 average weekday riders. It is an intermodal system, with three subway lines and one light metro line, with a total of 75 stations, the most of any Canadian system. The system connects each of Toronto's former municipalities, as well as the suburb of Vaughan.

 Line 1 Yonge–University is Toronto's oldest, longest, and busiest. It forms a U-shape, with Union station at its base, connecting to Toronto's intercity and commuter rail hub. The eastern leg travels north along Yonge Street to Finch. The western leg travels northwest, connecting to the University of Toronto and York University, before terminating at Vaughan Metropolitan Centre.
 Line 2 Bloor–Danforth is an east–west line, running primarily along its two namesakes, Bloor Street and Danforth Avenue. The line connects the east and western suburbs with Line 1 and downtown Toronto.
 Line 3 Scarborough is a light metro line. It connects the former municipality of Scarborough with Line 2 at its terminus at Kennedy station. The line is planned to be replaced with an extension of Line 2.
 Line 4 Sheppard is the shortest line on the system, with five stations along Sheppard Avenue in North York. It connects to Line 1 at Sheppard–Yonge station.

Line 5 Eglinton and Line 6 Finch West are both light rail lines under construction. The two lines will be fully integrated with the subway system upon their opening in 2023.

Toronto also operates a streetcar system. Unlike light rail, the majority of the ten routes operate in mixed traffic and all make frequent stops. Three routes operate in a dedicated right-of-way:

 510 Spadina running between Spadina station and Union station.
 509 Harbourfront running between Union station and Exhibition Place via Queens Quay station.
 512 St. Clair running along St. Clair Avenue West between St. Clair station and Gunns Loop via St. Clair West station.

The central section of the 504 King route runs along the King Street Transit Priority Corridor. The proposed East Bayfront LRT would be a fourth streetcar line operating in a dedicated right-of-way.

Vancouver 

The West Coast Express is a commuter rail line operated by TransLink. The  line runs from Waterfront station in downtown Vancouver to Mission, with six stations in between. The line only operates during peak hours on weekdays, with five trains heading west in the morning rush hour and 5 heading west in the afternoon rush hour. It is Canada's least-used urban rail transit system.

The SkyTrain is TransLink's fully-automated medium-capacity metro system. The system opened in 1985 for Expo 86. The system serves Vancouver and many of its surrounding municipalities in the Metro Vancouver Regional District.

 The Expo Line is named after Expo 86, for which it was originally constructed. It connects Waterfront station, an intermodal transit station in Downtown Vancouver, with Burnaby, New Westminster, and northwest Surrey. It roughly follows a northwest–southeast direction. Since 2016, a second branch of the line connects northward from Columbia station to the Millennium Line in Burnaby. A southeastward extension is planned to extend down the Fraser Highway to connect eastern Surrey and Langley. 
 The Millennium Line is named after the 3rd millennium, at the beginning of which it opened. Originally, it operated as a branch service of the Expo Line, following its alignment from Waterfront to Columbia station, before branching northeast back towards Vancouver through Burnaby. The opening of the Evergreen Extension in 2016 brought its current alignment, running roughly east–west from VCC–Clark station in Vancouver to Lafarge Lake–Douglas station in Coquitlam. An additional westward extension is under construction along Broadway to Arbutus station.
 The Canada Line was built in advance of the 2010 Winter Olympics. It uses distinct technology from the rest of the system and runs roughly north–south from Waterfront station, splitting in Richmond to head west to the Vancouver International Airport and south to the Brighouse area of Richmond.

Waterloo Region 

The first phase of the  Ion LRT system runs from Conestoga station in the City of Waterloo to Fairway station in Kitchener. It opened to the public on June 21, 2019. The system operates in reserved lanes on public streets and on private rights-of-way. Waterloo Region, Ontario has also approved plans for a light rail extension to the Ainslie St. Transit Terminal in Cambridge, as phase two of Ion.

In development

Gatineau

Gatineau, Quebec is proposing a  LRT system that would connect with Ottawa's O-Train system.

Hamilton 

Hamilton's B-Line route, part of the region's BLAST rapid transit network, was a proposed light rail line to run east–west along King and Main streets, with McMaster University and Eastgate Square as its termini. However, in announcing the financing for the line, the Government of Ontario changed the eastern terminus to Queenston Circle instead of Eastgate Square but added a branch to the new West Harbour GO Station. After uncertainty among Hamilton's city council and poor ridership projections in provincially funded studies, the provincial government announced that they would abandon the spur line down James North and a previously announced BRT system along James in favour of reinstating Eastgate Square as the terminal station of the B-Line. In December 2019, the Ontario government announced that the project would be abandoned, in part due to higher-than-anticipated costs. In February 2021, the province reversed their decision and announced their re-commitment to the Hamilton light rail project, and in May 2021, federal funding was confirmed.

Longueuil 

In February 2020, the mayor of Longueuil, Quebec, proposed building a tramway in stages running east to west, from Hôpital Pierre Boucher in Longueuil to La Prairie. The proposed line would mostly run along a reconfigured Taschereau Boulevard passing Cégep Édouard-Montpetit, Longueuil station (terminus of the Yellow Line of the Montreal Metro), Hôpital Charles-LeMoyne and the planned Panama station of the future Réseau express métropolitain in Brossard.

Montreal 

The Réseau express métropolitain is a light metro line under construction in Montreal. It is set to open in phases, beginning in 2022. When completed, it will consist of a central section connecting to the Green, Orange, and Blue metro lines, with four branches with service to the North Shore, West Island, airport, and South Shore.

Peel Region  

The Hurontario LRT is a  light rail line under construction which is largely financed by the Province of Ontario. It will run on the surface along Hurontario Street from Port Credit GO Station in Mississauga to Steeles Avenue in Brampton. On October 28, 2015, Brampton City Council cancelled the proposed  section of the line along Main Street in Brampton to Brampton GO Station. On March 21, 2019, Metrolinx announced that the most of the downtown loop would be deferred to a later date due to financial restrictions, although a short spur to a stop at Square One Shopping Centre would remain.

Quebec City 

The Quebec City Tramway is a planned light rail transit line in Quebec City set to open in 2028. It will link Beauport to Cap Rouge, passing through Quebec Parliament Hill. The  line will include a  underground segment, with the rest of the line being on the surface.

Cancelled

Surrey 

A  light rail network to consist of three lines radiating from SkyTrain stations had been proposed for construction in Surrey, British Columbia. The planned lines were:

 Surrey City Centre to Guildford Town Centre along 104 Avenue
 Surrey City Centre to Newton Town Centre along King George Boulevard
 Surrey City Centre via Fleetwood Town Centre to Langley along the Fraser Highway

The lines on 104 Avenue and King George Boulevard were to be built in seven years while the Surrey–Langley Line on the Fraser Highway would be finished five years later. A report on the economic benefits of the project was produced by a consulting firm in May 2015.

This project (among others major transit infrastructure initiatives, including the extension of the Millennium Line under Broadway in Vancouver) was originally made contingent, by the governing BC Liberal party, on the approval, by plebiscite in 2015, of a sales tax increase to generate new funds for public transit. The electorate voted against the tax increase, leaving the project unfunded. Subsequently, the project was included in the second phase of TransLink's 10-Year Investment Plan, which was approved in late 2017. However, in 2018, more than 80 percent of the city's residents objected to the line and potential problems, prompting several parties to adopt its cancellation as part of their platform during that year's civic election. A mayor and council who objected to the LRT were elected and their first order of business was to vote unanimously to cancel the LRT line in favour of extending the existing SkyTrain line to Langley, despite the lack of funding to do so. The LRT was "indefinitely suspended" by the regional Mayors' Council on November 15.

Toronto 

The Sheppard East LRT was a proposed  light rail transit line that would have run along the surface of Sheppard Avenue from Don Mills subway station to east of Morningside Avenue. It was cancelled in April 2019 by the Ontario provincial government under Premier Doug Ford.

Victoria region 

In August 2011, Victoria Regional Transit System announced that light rail transit was recommended as the preferred technology to connect Victoria to Saanich and the West Shore communities. In 2018, British Columbia premier John Horgan rejected the idea of light rail service in the Victoria area, arguing that the area's low population would not justify light rail.

See also 

 List of bus rapid transit systems in the Americas#Canada
 Public transport in Canada
 List of street railways in Canada – full list of operating and defunct street railways in the country

Notes

References 

Transport in Canada
Passenger rail transportation in North America